The Security Institute is a United Kingdom based professional body for security professionals.

Membership of the Institute is open to security professionals, with other individuals with an interest in security being able to become affiliated. Based on validation of experience, training, qualifications and other contributions, applicants are given one of five grades of membership. Associates (ASyI), Members (MSyI) and Fellows (FSyI) are entitled to use post-nominals indicating their level of membership in the Institute. There is a separate category for student members.

Activities 
The Security Institute hosts regular seminars and social events as well as an annual conference. Most of the activities are geared towards professional development.

As part of its work in raising industry standards the Institute place great emphasis on the work of its Validation Board and the assessment of members' achievements before joining. Existing members are encouraged to seek promotion to a higher membership level.

Continuing Professional Development
The Security Institute runs a mentoring programme and an assessed Continuing Professional Development (CPD) programme.

Training
PerpetuityARC, a Leicester based training provider, delivers certificate, diploma and advanced diploma qualifications via distance learning on behalf of the Security Institute. The Certificate in Security Management is a BTEC Level 3 qualification whereas the Diploma in Security Management is a BTEC Level 5 qualification.

Chartered Security Professionals

The Security Institute operates the Register of Chartered Security Professionals of behalf of the Worshipful Company of Security Professionals. The Institute was also the first licensee that can admit Chartered Security Professionals (CSyP). Membership of the Institute is separate from becoming a Chartered Security Professional, which involves a comprehensive documentation procedure of the candidate's competencies in security related subjects as well as an interview. The first CSyPs were admitted in June 2011.

History 
The Security Institute was established in 1999 "to enhance the professionalism and profile of the business of security." The founders, a group of different security professionals, wished to communicate how security is a separate professional field of activity. Realising that there was no objective system for measuring and accrediting security practitioners in the United Kingdom they decided to form the Security Institute.

In 2008, the Security Institute merged with the International Institute of Security (IISec), which had been established in 1968.

Chairperson 
 1999 - 2005: Geoff Whitfield FSyI
 2005 - 2009: Bill Wyllie CSyP FSyI
 2009 - 2013: Mike Bluestone MA CSyP FSyI
 2013 - 2015: Emma Shaw MBA CSyP FSyI FCMI
 2015 - 2017: Garry Evanson MSc BA PgDip PGCE CSyP FSyI
 2018 - 2021: Dr Alison Wakefield FSyI
 2021 - present: Peter Lavery FSyI

Awards 
The Security Institute awards several prizes.

The George van Schalkwyk Award was instituted in 2007 and is awarded to an individual who has made an outstanding contribution to the cause of security professionalism. The award is named after George van Schalkwyk, an institute member killed in a helicopter accident in Afghanistan in July 2006.

The John Aplin Award was instituted in 1998 by the International Institute of Security (IISec). It was initially awarded to the person who sat all six modules of the Certificate in Security Management examination in one day and achieved the highest score. After a reorganisation of the Certificate course the award was not awarded but was reestablished in 2008 after the IISec merger with the Security Institute, and awarded at the Annual General Meeting in the subsequent year. The award is named after Johns Aplin, a long-standing member, director and trustee of the International Institute of Security.

The Wilf Knight Award was instituted in 2008 and awarded for the first time in 2009. The award honours a student who has made a valuable academic contribution to the development of security management through distinction and/or innovation in methodology or theorising in the general field of security management and/or professional security practice. The Wilf Knight Award is presented at the annual Security Excellence Awards ceremony organised by United Business Media. The award is named after Wilf Knight (1944–2008) a former industry professional and member of the Institute.

See also 
 List of learned societies
 List of British professional bodies
 Worshipful Company of Security Professionals
 ASIS International
 Imbert Prize

References 

Organisations based in Warwickshire
Professional associations based in the United Kingdom
Security organizations
Borough of North Warwickshire